The Narita Line is the name for a combination of three railway lines located in Chiba Prefecture, Japan, operated by the East Japan Railway Company (JR East).

The main line connects Sakura Station and Matsugishi Station (as an alternate route to the Sōbu Main Line), and is sometimes referred to as the Samatsu Line. A branch line from Abiko Station to Narita Station is often called the Abiko Line, and a second branch, known as the Airport Line connects Narita to Narita Airport Terminal 1 Station. The first two lines are owned and operated by JR East; the Airport Line is owned by a separate company, Narita Airport Rapid Railway, which allows JR East and Keisei Railway to use the line for passenger services.

Stations

Main line
Legend:

 ● : All trains stop
 | : All trains pass

All stations are located in Chiba Prefecture.

Abiko branch line

Airport branch line

Services

Main line and Airport branch line
Narita Express trains travel on the Narita Line but stop only at Narita Airport Terminal 2·3 and Narita Airport Terminal 1 stations, except during morning and evening rush hours when some trains stop at Narita Station.

Rapid commuter trains run between Tokyo and Narita Airport Terminal 1, stopping at all stations between Tsuga and Narita Airport Terminal 1.

Abiko branch line
All services on the Abiko branch line are local trains stopping at all stations.

Rolling stock
Local service
 E131 series EMUs (since 13 March 2021, on Kashima Line through services)
 209-2000/2100 series EMUs

Abiko Branch Line, Jōban Line through service
 E231 series EMUs

Sōbu Line (Rapid) through service
 E217 series EMUs
 E235-1000 series EMUs

 Narita Express 
 E259 series EMUs

Past
 103 series EMUs (Abiko branch line services until March 2006)
 113 series EMUs (until September 2011)
 183 series EMUs (Ayame limited express services)
 211-3000 series EMUs (local services since 21 October 2006 until March 2013)
 253 series EMUs (Narita Express limited express services until June 2010)
 E257-500 series (Ayame limited express services)

History
The Sakura - Narita - Namegawa section of the line was opened on 19 January 1897, by Sobu Railway, extended to Sawara the following year. The Narita to Abiko branch opened in 1901. The company was nationalised in 1920, and the Sawara to Matsugishi section opened between 1931 and 1933.

The Sakura to Narita section was electrified (at 1,500 V DC overhead) in 1968. The Abiko branch was electrified from 1 October 1973. The Narita to Matsugishi section was electrified in 1974, and freight services ceased between 1984 and 1986.

The Sakura to Narita section was double-tracked in 1986, and the Airport branch opened in 1991 as an electrified, CTC-signalled line.

Accidents

In the early hours of 10 March 2011, a day before 2011 Tōhoku earthquake and tsunami occurred, a freight train carrying ethylene oxide derailed and overturned on the Narita Line near Namegawa Station.

References

External links
 Narita Line station numbering 

 
Lines of East Japan Railway Company
Railway lines in Chiba Prefecture
Airport rail links in Japan
1067 mm gauge railways in Japan
Railway lines opened in 1897
1897 establishments in Japan
Narita International Airport